The Jerrara Creek, a watercourse that is part of the Lachlan sub-catchment of the Murrumbidgee catchment within the Murray–Darling basin, is located in the South West Slopes region of New South Wales, Australia.

Course and features 

See also 

 List of rivers of New South Wales (A-K)
 Rivers of New South Wales

References

External links
 

Tributaries of the Lachlan River
Rivers of New South Wales